James Martin Taylor (November 27, 1930 – September 4, 1970) was a United States Air Force astronaut and test pilot. Although he trained for the USAF Manned Orbital Laboratory (MOL), the program was cancelled before any of the MOL crews reached space.

Taylor was born November 27, 1930, in Stamps, Arkansas, and graduated from the University of Michigan with a Bachelor of Science degree in electrical engineering in 1959. He joined the USAF and trained as a test pilot, graduating from the U.S. Air Force Test Pilot School in class 63A and MOL. In 1965, he was selected as one of the first astronauts to the Air Force's classified Manned Orbital Laboratory. The MOL program, canceled in 1969 before sending any astronauts into space, was to man a military space station with Air Force astronauts using a modified Gemini spacecraft. The history of the MOL program was presented in the Public Television series NOVA episode called Astrospies which first aired February 12, 2008.

After the MOL program cancellation, Taylor continued his USAF career as an instructor at the Test Pilot School and served as deputy commandant. On September 4, 1970, he and French air force exchange test pilot trainee, Pierre J. du Bucq, were killed when their T-38 aircraft crashed during a training mission at Palmdale Regional Airport. The crash was caused by severe wake turbulence from a C-141 that was performing touch-and-goes on an intersecting runway. At the time of his death, Taylor held the rank of lieutenant colonel. In memory of Taylor, the Test Pilot School presented the James M. Taylor Award to the outstanding graduate of the Experimental Test Pilot Course (Phase 1). The award was discontinued after class 71B when the school's curriculum was revised to eliminate the Phase I and II designation.

Attended by his fellow MOL astronauts, Taylor was buried at McChord Air Force Base in Pierce County, Washington. He is survived by his wife, Jacquelyn, and three children.

References

External links

 
 
 
 

1930 births
1970 deaths
Accidental deaths in California
American astronauts
American test pilots
Aviators killed in aviation accidents or incidents in the United States
People from Stamps, Arkansas
United States Air Force officers
University of Michigan College of Engineering alumni
U.S. Air Force Test Pilot School alumni
Victims of aviation accidents or incidents in 1970